The 1999-00 Allied Dunbar Premiership Two was the thirteenth full season of rugby union within the second tier of the English league system, currently known as the RFU Championship. Allied Dunbar sponsored the top two divisions of the English rugby union leagues for the third season in a row. The leagues were previously known as the Courage Clubs Championship and sponsored by Courage Brewery.  New teams to the division included West Hartlepool who had been relegated from the Allied Dunbar Premiership 1998-99 while Henley Hawks and Manchester had been promoted from National League 1. Exeter were also rebranded as the 'Chiefs' from this season onward.

Rotherham, the champions, were promoted to the Allied Dunbar Premiership for season 2000–01 after beating the 12th placed team from that division, (Bedford), in a two legged play–off. There was only one promotion place available and the runners–up Leeds Tykes remained in Premiership Two for the following season. Rugby and West Hartlepool were relegated to the 2000–01 National Division Two.

Participating teams

Table

Results

Round 1

Round 2

Round 3

Round 4

Round 5

Round 6

Round 7

Round 8

Round 9

Round 10

Round 11

Round 12

Round 13 

Postponed.  Game rescheduled for 29 January 2000.

Postponed.  Game rescheduled for 1 May 2000.

Round 14

Round 15

Round 16 

Postponed.  Game rescheduled for 5 February 2000.

Round 13 (Rescheduled game)

Round 16 (Rescheduled game)

Round 17

Round 18 

Postponed.  Game rescheduled for 1 April 2000.

Round 19

Round 20

Round 21 

Postponed.  Game rescheduled for 1 April 2000.

Round 18, 21 & 25 (Rescheduled games) 

Game brought forward from 29 April 2000.

Round 22

Round 23

Round 24

Round 25 

Game brought forward to 2 April 2000.

Round 13 (Rescheduled game)

Round 26

Total Season Attendances

Individual statistics 

 Note if players are tied on tries or points the player with the lowest number of appearances will come first.  Also note that points scorers includes tries as well as conversions, penalties and drop goals.

Top points scorers

Top try scorers

Season records

Team
Largest home win — 85 pts
93 - 8 Rotherham at home to West Hartlepool on 2 October 1999
Largest away win — 69 pts
84 - 15 Worcester away to Wakefield on 16 October 1999
Most points scored — 93 pts
93 - 8 Rotherham at home to West Hartlepool on 2 October 1999
Most tries in a match — 13 (x2)
Rotherham at home to West Hartlepool on 2 October 1999
Worcester away to Wakefield on 16 October 1999
Most conversions in a match — 11
Rotherham at home to West Hartlepool on 2 October 1999
Most penalties in a match — 8
Henley Hawks away to Rugby Lions on 15 January 2000
Most drop goals in a match — 2
Manchester at home to Orrell on 2 October 1999

Player
Most points in a match — 41
 Simon Binns for Rotherham at home to West Hartlepool on 2 October 1999
Most tries in a match — 4
 Andy Currier for London Welsh at home to Waterloo on 16 October 1999
Most conversions in a match — 10 (x3)
 Simon Binns for Rotherham at home to West Hartlepool on 2 October 1999
 Mike Umaga for Rotherham at home to Waterloo on 11 March 2000
 Sam Howard for Exeter at home to West Hartlepool on 6 May 2000
Most penalties in a match —  8
 Matt Jones for Henley Hawks away to Rugby Lions on 15 January 2000
Most drop goals in a match —  2
 Rod Ellis for Manchester at home to Orrell on 2 October 1999

Attendances

Highest — 5,019 
Leeds Tykes at home to Rotherham on 18 February 2000
Lowest — 300 (x3) 
Waterloo at home to London Welsh on 19 February 2000, West Hartlepool at home to Orrell on 18 March 2000 & Exeter Chiefs on 1 May 2000
Leeds Tykes at home to Moseley on 16 April 1999
Highest Average Attendance — 2,487
Worcester
Lowest Average Attendance — 379
Waterloo

See also
 English rugby union system

References

1999–2000 in English rugby union leagues
1999-2000